William Newnham may refer to:

William Newnham (engineer) (1888–1974), New Zealand civil engineer and engineering administrator
William Newnham (physician) (1790–1865), English physician
William Thomson Newnham (1923–2014), Canadian educator